Dinker may refer to;

 Dinker, a player of pickleball that excels at dinking
 Dinker Belle Rai, an Indian American vascular surgeon
 Dinker-Irvin House, an historic house in Bethany Beach, Delaware.